Dionne Yvette Farris  (born December 4, 1969) is an American singer, songwriter, and producer. Born and raised in New Jersey, she began singing in elementary school and competed in pageants as a teenager. In the early 1990s, she was featured on the hip hop group Arrested Development (1992) hit single  "Tennessee".

Farris rose to fame with the release of her debut album, Wild Seed – Wild Flower (1994) on Columbia Records. The album featured the Top 40 single, "I Know" (1995). That same year, the video earned Farris the Billboard Music Video Awards Best Pop/Rock New Artist Clip of the Year. She was nominated for the Grammy Award for Best Female Pop Vocal Performance (1996).

Early life
Farris was born in Plainfield, New Jersey, the daughter of Larraine (Wall) and Richard Farris, both of whom had musical talents and aspirations, and named Dionne for their favorite singer Dionne Warwick. Farris was raised in Bordentown, New Jersey by her single mother, whose side of the family introduced her to the musical acts that shaped and influenced her. Farris was a huge fan of Diana Ross as a child – one of Farris’ fonder memories was attending a Ross concert in Manhattan at the age of eight, being lifted by her uncle onstage, and getting kissed by the superstar.

Farris began taking dance lessons at the age of three at Irene Parker Dance Studio in Hamilton Township, New Jersey. She danced ballet, jazz, tap, and toe for 10 years, opting at 13 to sing instead. She sang in her high school's choir.

After graduating from Bordentown Regional High in 1987, Farris attended Mercer County Community College, where she studied photography. Farris entered into the Miss Hemisphere Pageant regional competitions, directly after high school and won her first and only pageant as 1987's Miss Hemisphere's Adult Talent, singing Whitney Houston's "Saving All My Love for You" in Miami, Florida. She joined a band known as 2.0 and later as Breaking Ground. They began performing on the Manhattan's club circuit, and looked to sign a record deal. Farris decided to move to Atlanta with her then boyfriend Donald "Rasa Don" Jones (one of the early members of Arrested Development), where her father lived. After a short time, Farris met with Atlanta producer Jermaine Dupri and began writing songs for Atlanta-based acts such as TLC and singing backgrounds for acts such as Xscape, and El Debarge. She signed a management contract with Michael Mauldin's (father of Dupri) company as a solo artist, but later became a member of a girl group they were producing, known as Onyx (a name later co-opted by a semi-gangsta rap group).

Career

Arrested Development
Farris and Arrested Development were signed to the same management company. The group wanted a female singer for their  3 Years, 5 Months & 2 Days in the Life Of... album and Farris, although she was not interested in being in the group, agreed to sing with them and became an unofficial "extended family" member. Farris sang on three songs with the group: "Fishin' 4 Religion", "Give a Man a Fish" and "Tennessee". Farris performed the song with Arrested Development on the 1992 MTV Movie Awards and The Arsenio Hall Show as well as went on the group's first national tour. After the success of "Tennessee", she began to receive media attention, and Duff Marlo offered Farris a solo deal, contingent upon Speech producing the project, but she rejected the offer in search of a deal where she would have artistic control. Farris began experiencing personal and business conflicts with the group's leader despite the success of "Tennessee"  (the band's first and biggest hit in 1992). Farris was never an official member of the band, and she left the group in September 1992 before a show at the Fox Theater after having a fight with Speech and co-leader Headliner.

Wild Seed – Wild Flower
Farris reached out to Milton Davis and David Harris and began a collaboration. A demo sent to Sony Music was first reviewed by Bobby Colomby, then by Randy Jackson (who became known as a judge on American Idol). Jackson signed Farris to a deal at Columbia Records. Her debut album, Wild Seed – Wild Flower (1994), featured the 1995 single "I Know", which reached number four on the Billboard Hot 100 and was nominated for the Grammy Award for Best Female Pop Vocal Performance in 1996. In the UK Singles Chart, "I Know" peaked (after a re-release) at No. 41 in May 1995. Wild Seed – Wild Flower reached No. 57 on the Billboard 200 chart. Radio & Records magazine ranked "I Know" as the number-one most played song on mainstream Top 40/CHR radio stations for 1995 and spent 10 consecutive weeks at No. 1 on the Mainstream Top 40 chart (April 1 – June 3, 1995).

On April 8, 1995, she was the musical guest on Saturday Night Live, performing "I Know" and a roots acoustic rendition of the Beatles song "Blackbird."

Soundtracks
In 1995, her version of Billy Taylor's "I Wish I Knew How It Would Feel to Be Free" appeared on the soundtrack to the documentary The Promised Land. It appeared again as the opening song to the film Ghosts of Mississippi, about the true story of the 1994 trial of Byron De La Beckwith, the white supremacist accused of the 1963 assassination of civil rights activist of Medgar Evers. Farris' soundtrack work continued for the movie The Truth About Cats & Dogs, in which she contributed a version of the Stevie Wonder classic "For Once in My Life" as the closing song and the movie The First Wives Club with a rendition of Bill Withers' "Heartbreak Road". Her single "Hopeless" (written by Van Hunt) appears on the Love Jones soundtrack (1997).

For Truth If Not Love
Farris recorded a second album For Truth if Not Love with Columbia, but she and the label parted ways before the project was released. It was released in 2007, issued on iTunes. It featured the track "Stuck in the Middle".

Independent releases
Farris released her official follow-up album Signs of Life  in (2011), named Top 10 soul albums of 2011, a mixtape Lady Dy, the Mixtape Pt 1 (2011) and a live jazz album Dionne Get Your Gunn: Featuring the Russell Gunn Quartet with Dionne Farris (2012) via PledgeMusic crowd funding on her own record label, Free & Clear Records.

Personal life
Farris has a daughter, rapper Baby Tate, whose father is former Follow for Now member David Ryan Harris.

Discography

Albums
 Wild Seed – Wild Flower (1994), Columbia
 For Truth If Not Love (2007), Music World
 Signs of Life, (2011), Free & Clear Records
 Dionne Get Your Gunn (2013), Free & Clear Records
DionneDionne (2014), Free & Clear Records

Mixtapes
Lady Dy, The Mixtape pt. 1 (2011), Free & Clear Records

Singles
"I Know" (1995), Sony
"Don't Ever Touch Me Again" (1995), Sony
"Passion" (1996), Sony
"Food for Thought" (1996), Sony [promo]
"For Once in My Life" (1996), The Truth About Cats & Dogs (movie soundtrack)
"Hopeless" (1997), Sony

Soundtracks
The Promised Land (1994), Columbia
The Truth About Cats & Dogs (1996), A&M
First Wives Club (1996), Work Group
Ghosts of Mississippi (1996), Sony
Love Jones (1997), Sony

References

External links 
Dionne Farris Official website

1969 births
Living people
20th-century African-American women singers
American contemporary R&B singers
American soul musicians
American neo soul singers
Columbia Records artists
People from Bordentown, New Jersey
Musicians from Plainfield, New Jersey
Singers from New Jersey
21st-century American women singers
Arrested Development (group) members
21st-century American singers
African-American rock musicians
21st-century African-American women singers